The York White Roses was the name of a minor league baseball team in the city of York, Pennsylvania, US, that existed from 1894–1969.

History

Early years
The York White Roses began as members of the short-lived Keystone Association in 1884. The league disbanded after only 20 games. The White Roses transferred to the Eastern League after the Harrisburg Olympics folded. The team remained in the Eastern League until the 1893 season when York joined the Pennsylvania State League.

Turn of the 20th century
York joined the Tri-State League as the York Penn Parks in 1904. York defeated Williamsport before 3,500 fans at the Phillies' ball park in Philadelphia for the new league's first championship.

The name was quickly changed back to White Roses for the 1905 season. The 1906 season was full of controversy when the rival Lancaster Maroons changed their name to the Red Roses. George Heckert, White Roses manager, publicly denounced Lancaster's team  and predicted that Lancaster would end the season in last place after it unveiled new jerseys and a new name days before the season opener against York. Yorkers viewed the change as a copycat maneuver since York had called itself the White Roses since 1884. The Red Roses went on to win the first game, 9–4, and an even heavier rivalry began. Some sources indicate that the rival teams were named for the opposing factions in England's Wars of the Roses.

In 1907, the York franchise was moved to Reading, Pennsylvania, and became the Reading Pretzels for the 1908 season. In 1908 a York team played as members of the Pennsylvania-New Jersey League. The White Roses returned to York for the 1909 season. They made another move in 1914 when rival Lancaster Red Roses moved to Atlantic City. After a bad start to the season in York, the White Roses moved to Lancaster and became the Red Roses for the second half of the 1914 season. The franchise remained in Lancaster until The Tri State league broke up at the end of the 1914 season.

New era of White Roses
York is one of the six original teams of the New York–Pennsylvania League, joining for the inaugural season in 1923. The White Roses quickly became one of the powerhouse franchises in the League and won their first league championship on September 25, 1925, defeating the Williamsport Grays 5–3, in 11 innings in the fourth and final game of a best-of-five series. York first baseman Del Bissonette homered in the bottom of the 11th to clinch the title.

The White Roses were unaffiliated until the 1933 season when they became part of the Brooklyn Dodgers minor league system. Financial hardships due to the Great Depression caused this version of the White Roses to fold after the 1933 season. The team came out of the dark in 1936 when the Harrisburg Senators were forced to relocate after the 1935 season. The stay in York was brief, as the franchise moved mid-season, becoming the Trenton Senators on July 2, 1936.

The White Roses joined the Interstate League in 1943, spending most of their seasons in this league (1943–1952) as an affiliate of the Pittsburgh Pirates until 1950. From 1953 to 1955, the White Roses were members of the Piedmont League, affiliated with the St. Louis Browns from 1952 to 1953 and the Baltimore Orioles from 1954 to 1955. Hall of Fame player Brooks Robinson played his first professional season for the 1955 White Roses. 

The White Roses re-joined the Eastern League, affiliated with the St. Louis Cardinals, in the 1958 season and played there until the end of the 1959 season. The York White Roses returned in 1962 as a member of the Eastern League, as the Johnstown Red Sox moved to York. The Boston Red Sox affiliation lasted only that season. They were affiliated with the Washington Senators from 1963 to 1967.

York Pirates

In 1968, the team was renamed as the York Pirates, affiliated once again with Pittsburgh.  Sunday, April 21, 1968, marked a historic event in York baseball history when the York Pirates and Reading Phillies played the first outdoor game on artificial turf at York's Memorial Stadium. York lost 5–3 but the 6,248 audience was also the largest crowd in York's minor-league history.

The 1969 season was the last season of York minor-league baseball in the 20th century. After many dismal seasons in the 1960s the York Pirates made it to the Finals against the Pittsfield Red Sox. Pittsfield won the first game of the series 7–4 but the remaining games of the Championship were rained out and York was named champions (York was in first place in the league that season).

Stadium
The White Roses had numerous ballparks during the first half of the 20th century. In 1947, York moved its minor-league team from Memorial Field in West York, Pennsylvania, to Memorial Stadium in York. York's minor-league clubs continued to play at Veterans Memorial Stadium/Bob Hoffman Stadium until the York Pirates folded at the end of the 1969 season.

Notable alumni

Hall of Fame alumni

 Brooks Robinson Inducted, 1983

Other notable alumni

Year-by-year record

Keystone Association  (1884)

Eastern League (1884)

Pennsylvania State League (1893)

Tri-State League (1909–1914)

New York–Penn League (1923–1933, 1936)

Interstate League (1943–1952)

Piedmont League (1953–1955)

Eastern League (1958–1969)

 *1969– Playoffs Rained out, York Pirates named Eastern League Champions

See also
 York Revolution
 Lancaster Red Roses

References

Defunct minor league baseball teams
Defunct Eastern League (1938–present) teams
Defunct baseball teams in Pennsylvania
Defunct sports teams in Pennsylvania
Sports in York, Pennsylvania
Baltimore Orioles minor league affiliates
Brooklyn Dodgers minor league affiliates
Pittsburgh Pirates minor league affiliates
St. Louis Browns minor league affiliates
St. Louis Cardinals minor league affiliates
Boston Red Sox minor league affiliates
Washington Senators (1961–1971) minor league affiliates
1969 disestablishments in Pennsylvania
1894 establishments in Pennsylvania
Baseball teams established in 1894
Baseball teams disestablished in 1969
Defunct New York–Penn League teams
Defunct Interstate League teams
Defunct Tri-State League teams
Piedmont League teams